Ginny Hawker and Tracy Schwarz are an American folk music duo known for performing traditional music from the early American canon of bluegrass, gospel, and old time music.  The duo, however, on occasion does record original songs and music by contemporary songwriters. They live in West Virginia. Tracy Schwarz was a member of the New Lost City Ramblers.

Selected discography

Ginny Hawker and Tracy Schwarz
 Draw Closer (2004, Rounder)
 with Ron Stewart, Peter Schwarz, and Kari Sickenberger
 produced by Dirk Powell
 Good Songs for Hard Times (2000, Copper Creek)
 with Buddy Griffin, Jim Martin, and Peter Schwarz

Ginny Hawker
 Letters from my Father, Ginny Hawker (2001 Rounder)
 with Tim O'Brien, Darrell Scott, Ron Stewart, Dirk Powell, Dennis Crouch, and Kenny Malone
 Bristol, A Tribute to the Carter Family, Ginny Hawker & Kay Justice (1999, Copper Creek/June Appal)
 with Tracy Schwarz and Mike Seeger
 Heart of a Singer, Hazel Dickens, Carol Elizabeth Jones, and Ginny Hawker (1998 Rounder)
 with Ron Stewart, Pete Kennedy, Dudley Connell, Barry Mitterhoff, Marshall Wilborn, Bruce Molsky, and Lynn Morris.
 Come All You Tenderhearted, Ginny Hawker & Kay Justice (1995, June Appal)
 Signs & Wonders, Ginny Hawker & Kay Justice (June Appal)
 Pathway to West Virginia, Ginny Hawker & Kay Justice (Pathway)

Tracy Schwarz
 New Lost City Ramblers: 40 Years of Concert Recordings (2001 Rounder)
 There Ain't No Way Out, The New Lost City Ramblers (1997 Smithsonian Folkways)
 A Cajun Practice Music Tape, Tracy Schwarz Mes Amis!, The Tracy Schwarz Cajun Trio (1996, Swallow)
 with Matt Haney and Lee Blackwell
 Feel Bad Sometime (1990 Marimac Recordings)
 Louisiana And You (1991 Marimac Recordings)
 The Tracy Schwarz Cajun Trio (1993, Swallow)
 How to Play the Cajun Accordion, Marc Savoy and Tracy Schwarz
 Strange Creek Singers (1972, Arhoolie)
 50 Years: Where Do You Come From? Where Do You Go? (2009 Smithsonian Folkways)
 Cajun Fiddle, Old and New: Instruction (1977 Smithsonian Folkways)
 Classic Old-Time Fiddle from Smithsonian Folkways (2007 Smithsonian Folkways)
 Dancing Bow and Singing Strings (1979 Smithsonian Folkways)
 Down Home with Tracy and Eloise Schwarz (1978 Smithsonian Folkways)
 Learn to Fiddle Country Style (1965 Smithsonian Folkways)
 Les Quatre Vieux Garçons:Dewey and Tony Balfa, and Tracy and Peter Schwarz (1984 Smithsonian Folkways)
 Look Out! Here It Comes (1975 Smithsonian Folkways)
 Modern Times: The New Lost City Ramblers (1968 Smithsonian Folkways)
 On the Great Divide: The New Lost City Ramblers (1975 Smithsonian Folkways)
 Out Standing in Their Field: The New Lost City Ramblers, Vol . 2, 1963-1973 (1993 Smithsonian Folkways)
 Remembrance of Things to Come: The New Lost City Ramblers (1973 Smithsonian Folkways)
 Rural Delivery No. 1: The New Lost City Ramblers (1964 Smithsonian Folkways)
 String Band Instrumentals: The New Lost City Ramblers (1964 Smithsonian Folkways)
 The Harry Smith Connection: A Live Tribute to the Anthology of American Folk Music (1998 Smithsonian Folkways)
 The New New Lost City Ramblers with Tracy Schwarz: Gone to the Country (1963 Smithsonian Folkways)
 Tracy Schwarz's Fiddler's Companion (1981 Smithsonian Folkways)
 Tracy's Family Band: Rode the Mule Around the World (1981 Smithsonian Folkways)
 Traditional Cajun Fiddle: Instruction'' (1976 Smithsonian Folkways)

External links
ginnyandtracy.com, official web site
[ Ginny Hawker] at Allmusic
[ Tracy Schwarz] at Allmusic

American folk musical groups
Old-time bands
Musical groups from West Virginia